Margaret M. Thom DStJ  (born 1951) is the commissioner of the Northwest Territories. She previously served as the deputy commissioner of the Northwest Territories, Canada, from June 2, 2005, until October 2011. In June 2022 she was appointed to a second term. 

Thom was born and raised in Fort Providence in an Indigenous family and worked a number of jobs before enrolling in a counselling program at Aurora College during the 1990s, subsequently becoming a counsellor at Deh Gáh School in Fort Providence.

Thom is a member of the NWT Education Hall of Fame and has been awarded the Territorial Wise Woman Award.

Honours and Arms 

Appointments

Coat of Arms 
Thom was granted a coat of arms through Grant of Arms and Supporters, with differences to Tina Marie Gargan, Melanie Georgette Thom-Gargan, Lee Maria Thom and Tamara Rosalie Thom-Field, on May 15, 2019.

References

External links
Deputy Commissioner Margaret Thom Biography

Living people
21st-century Canadian politicians
21st-century First Nations people
Commissioners of the Northwest Territories
Dene people
First Nations women
Northwest Territories Deputy Commissioners
Women in Northwest Territories politics
Dames of Justice of the Order of St John
Members of the Order of the Northwest Territories
1951 births
21st-century Canadian women politicians